Benzyl salicylate is a salicylic acid benzyl ester, a chemical compound  most frequently used in cosmetics as a fragrance additive or UV light absorber. It appears as an almost colorless liquid with a mild odor described as "very faint, sweet-floral, slightly balsamic" by some, while others smell nothing at all. There is debate whether the odour is caused solely by impurities or a genetic predisposition. It occurs naturally in a variety of plants and plant extracts and is widely used in blends of fragrance materials.

There is some evidence that people may become sensitized to this material and as a result, there is a restriction standard concerning the use of this material in fragrances by the International Fragrance Association.

It is used as  a solvent for crystalline synthetic musks and as a component and fixative in floral perfumes such as carnation, jasmine, lilac, and wallflower.

See also
Oil of wintergreen

References

External links 
 

Salicylate esters
Benzyl esters
3-Hydroxypropenals